Iskusstvo Kino (Russian: Искусство кино, Film Art) is a film magazine published in Moscow, Russia. It has been published since 1931 and is one of the earliest magazines in Europe which specialize on film theory and review alongside the British magazine Sight & Sound and the French magazine Cahiers du Cinéma.

History and profile
The magazine was founded in 1931. The headquarters is in Moscow. It was published on a monthly basis from its start in 1931 to 1941. Following its temporary closure during World War II it was relaunched in 1945 and was published irregularly between 1945 and 1947. After that it was published bi-monthly from 1947 to 1951. Since 1952 it has been published monthly.

During the Soviet period Iskusstvo Kino was the official magazine for cinema industry in the country. The magazine included the editorials by the leading Communist Party officials. At the same time it argued that films should meet the demands by public. From 1963 the magazine and another film magazine Soviet Screen began to be published newly founded state-funded company Goskino, which was responsible body for the coordination of film production and distribution in the Soviet Union.

The magazine covers articles on film theory and film reviews. American scholar Vladimir Padunov contributed to the eightieth anniversary issue of the magazine. In the 1960s Valerii Golovskoi was the editor. Daniil Dondurey is among magazine's editors.

During the 1980s Iskusstvo Kino had a print run of 50,000 copies, while the magazine sold 2,000–3,000 copies in the 1990s. In 2004 the magazine sold 5,000 copies.

The longtime editor-in-chief Daniil Dondurey died in 2017. He was succeeded by Anton Dolin, who raised a crowdfunding campaign for the magazine that gathered 3 million rubles.

The magazine was archived by East View Information Services, Inc. based in Minneapolis.

The editors 
 Ivan Pyryev (1946)
 Nikolai Lebedev (1947–1949)
 Dmitri Eryomin (1949–1951)
 Vitaly Zhdan (1951–1956)
 Lyudmila Pogozheva (1956–1969)
 Yevgeny Surkov (1969–1982)
 Armen Medvedev (1982–1984)
 Yuri Cherepanov (1984–1986)
 Konstantin Shcherbakov (1987–1992)
 Daniil Dondurey (1993–2017)
 Anton Dolin (2017–2022)
 Stanislav Dedinsky (since 2022)

See also
 List of film periodicals

References

External links
 
 

1931 establishments in the Soviet Union
Bi-monthly magazines
Communist magazines
Eastern Bloc mass media
Film magazines
Irregularly published magazines
Magazines established in 1931
Magazines published in Moscow
Magazines published in the Soviet Union
Monthly magazines published in Russia
Russian-language magazines
Former state media